Telemos may refer to:
 Telemus, son of Eurymus in Greek mythology;
 The BAE/Dassault Telemos unmanned aircraft.
 Telemos, a character in Aion: The Tower of Eternity
 Telemos International Group, a business in the Netherlands.